Yevgeny Viktorovich Zharinov (born 26 June 1954) is a Russian writer, literary critic, publicist, translator. Professor of the Department of World  Literature, Faculty of Philology, Moscow State Pedagogical University.

Biography
Yevgeny was born on 26 June 1954 in Moscow. In 1971 he graduated from school. In 1972-1973 he studied at the Moscow Aviation Institute. In 1974 he entered Moscow State Pedagogical University's Faculty of Philology, in 1979 he graduated with an Honors Diploma, and began teaching in school.  In 1985 he defended his thesis on the works of Leo Tolstoy. Engaged in the translation from English of modern novels, in particular, is known as one of Ursula Le Guin’s translators of A Wizard of Earthsea and the detectives of Phillip Margolin. In 1999 he defended his doctoral thesis on Western fiction. Member of the Union of Writers of Russia.

Personal life
He is married, he has two sons, Nikolai and Stanislav.

References

External links
 Лекции о зарубежной литературе. От Гомера до Данте
 От Шекспира до Агаты Кристи. Как читать и понимать классику

1954 births
Living people
Writers from Moscow
English–Russian translators
Moscow State Pedagogical University alumni
Literary scholars
Russian studies scholars